The South Africa national under-20 rugby union team (nicknamed the Junior Boks or the Baby Boks) are South Africa's junior team at national level. They have been competing in the World Rugby Under 20 Championship (formerly the IRB Junior World Championship) since its inception in 2008. This Under-20 tournament replaced the previously-held Under-19 and Under-21 Rugby World Championships. Prior to 2018, it had been the country's "next senior" (second-level) 15-man national side, but World Rugby no longer allows member unions to designate age-grade sides as "next senior" teams.

History

Head to Head

 Stats correct as of 23 June 2019

Summary

2008

South Africa took part in the inaugural edition of the competition in 2008 held in Wales, where they were drawn in Pool B. They beat the United States 108–18 in their very first game. A 72–3 victory over Scotland and a 16–11 win against Samoa saw them top the pool to qualify for the semi-final stages. They lost their semi-final match 18–26 to England, but returned to winning ways with a 43–18 win over hosts Wales in the third-place play-off match.

Matches

2009

South Africa were placed in Pool C of the 2009 competition held in Japan. They emulated their 2008 form, winning all three of their pool matches – they beat Fiji 36–10, Italy 65–3 and France 43–27 to finish top of the pool. They again lost to England in the semi-finals (losing 21–40), but again bounced back by winning the third-place play-off match, this time beating Australia 32–5.

Matches

2010

A 40–14 victory over Tonga in the opening match of Pool C in the 2010 IRB Junior World Championship held in Argentina was followed up by a 73–0 victory over Scotland, before South Africa suffered their first ever pool stage defeat in the competition, losing 35–42 to Australia. Although finishing in second position in the pool, they still qualified for the semi-finals by virtue of having the best record of the second-placed teams across the three pools. They were eliminated 7–36 by New Zealand in the semi-finals, but managed to win the third-place play-off for the third year in a row, avenging their previous semi-final exists at the hands of England by beating them 27–22.

2011

Victories in South Africa's first two matches at the 2011 IRB Junior World Championship held in Italy – beating Scotland 33–0 and Ireland 42–26 – were followed by a defeat at the hands of England, losing 20–26 to finish second in the pool and failing to qualify for the semi-finals for the first time. Instead, they went into the fifth-placed play-off series, where a 57–15 win over pool rivals Ireland and a 104–17 win over Fiji saw them finish the competition in fifth spot.

2012

South Africa hosted the tournament in 2012, but the hosts got off to a bad start, losing 19–23 to Ireland in their first match. However, they recovered to beat Italy 52–3 and previously-unbeaten England 28–15 to finish top of the log. They easily dispatched Argentina in the semi-final, winning 35–3, before beating New Zealand 22–16 in the final in Cape Town, winning the competition for the first time and ending the latter's four-year reign as champions.

2013

South Africa won all three their pool matches at the 2013 IRB Junior World Championship held in France; they beat the United States 97–0, England 31–24 and hosts France 26–19 to top their pool to qualify to the semi-finals. They lost their semi-final match 17–18 to Wales before winning their fourth third-place play-off match in six seasons, beating New Zealand 41–34.

2014

In the 2014 IRB Junior World Championship held in New Zealand, South Africa beat Scotland 61–5, hosts New Zealand 33–24 and Samoa 21–8 to finish top of their pool. They again met New Zealand in the semi-finals and beat them again, this time by a 32–25 scoreline, to qualify to their second final. However, they lost the final 20–21 to England to finish the competition in second spot.

2015

For 2015, the IRB Junior World Championship was rebranded as the World Rugby Under 20 Championship. South Africa started the competition with a 33–5 win against hosts Italy and recorded a 40–8 win against Samoa and a 46–13 win over Australia in their remaining pool matches to finish top of Pool B to qualify for the semi-finals with the best record pool stage of all the teams in the competition. They came up against an England side that beat them in the 2014 final and were eliminated by the same opponents again, losing 20–28 to be eliminated from the competition. They restored some pride by winning their third-place play-off match against France 31–18 to win the bronze medal.

2016

South Africa came from behind to beat Japan 59–19 in their opening match in Pool C of the 2016 World Rugby Under 20 Championship held in Manchester. They were beaten 13–19 by Argentina in their second match, suffering only their fourth defeat ever in the pool stage of the competition, but bounced back to secure a 40-31 bonus-point victory over France in their final pool match to secure a semi-final place as the best runner-up in the competition. They faced hosts and three-time champions England in the semi-finals, who proved too strong for the visitors, knocking them out of the competition with a 39–17 victory. South Africa's final match came against Argentina, who already beat them previously in Pool C, in the third-place play-off final. Argentina won again, with a very convincing 49–19 scoreline, condemning South Africa to fourth place in the competition.

Players

Current squad

The following players were named in the South Africa Under-20 squad for the 2019 World Rugby Under 20 Championship:

(c) denotes the team captain. For each match, the player's squad number is shown. Starting players are numbered 1 to 15, while the replacements are numbered 16 to 23. "App" refers to the number of appearances made by the player, "Try" to the number of tries scored by the player, "Con" to the number of conversions kicked, "Pen" to the number of penalties kicked, "DG" to the number of drop goals kicked and "Pts" refer to the total number of points scored by the player.

Previous squads

The following players played at previous editions of the World Rugby Under 20 Championship:

(c) denotes team captain.

External links

References

National under-20 rugby union teams
Rugby union